The Islas San Benito lie in the Pacific Ocean off the west coast of the Mexican state of Baja California, 25 km west of Cedros Island. They are part of the Cedros Island delegación, a subdivision of Ensenada (municipality), Baja California.

The group consists of three barren islands, with a total area of 3.899 km2, and is surrounded by rocks and patches of kelp. The census of 2001 recorded a population of two on Benito del Oeste (West Benito); the other islands are uninhabited.

Geography and ecology
Benito del Oeste (West Benito, 2.6 km2) is the westernmost and largest island of the group. It appears as a plateau with a mound rising 600 ft (202 m) high near the center. A lighthouse tower, 4 m high, stands in the southern part of the island. The main lighthouse, a prominent, 17 m high tower with a dwelling, stands near the northwest extremity of the island. Rocas Pinaculo, two steep-to rocks, lie 1.6 km west of Benito del Oeste.

Benito del Centro (Central Benito, 0.4 km2)  and Benito del Este (East Benito, 0.9 km2) , the other two islands, lie close east of Benito del Oeste and are separated by Canal de Peck, a deep passage just 200 ft (c. 65 m) wide. Benito del Este is characterized by four well-defined hills up to 421 ft (c.140 m) high. Benito del Centro is low and flat with a hill 82 ft (25 m) high rising near its eastern end.

The vegetation consists mainly of low shrubs and herbs as well as some large cacti (Cylindropuntia prolifera, C. ramosissima). There are few land animals and no native mammals. Birds are moderately abundant due to the islands' barrenness, but Cassin's auklet is rather plentiful at breeding time.

Endemism
Due to the islands' remoteness, several endemic taxa have evolved here:

Animals:
 San Benito side-blotched lizard, Uta stansburiana stellata
 San Benito house finch, Carpodacus mexicanus mcgregori – extinct
Disappeared c. the 1940s, mainly due to overhunting by biological specimen collectors.
 San Benito sparrow, Passerculus rostratus sanctorum (or Passerculus sandwichensis sanctorum)

Plants:
 Cryptantha patula – only on West Benito
 Dudleya linearis – only on West Benito
 Hemizonia streetsii – West and East Benito
 Malva pacifica – all islands
 Mammillaria neopalmeri – West and East Benito
 Senecio benedictus – only on West Benito

References

Islands of Ensenada Municipality
Islands of Baja California
.
Uninhabited islands of Mexico
Islands of the Pacific Ocean